Black Noise may refer to:

 Black noise, a type of noise consisting of mostly silence
 Black Noise (group), a hip-hop crew from Cape Town, South Africa
 Black Noise (FM album)
 Black Noise (Pantha du Prince album)
 Black Noise (book), by Tricia Rose